Mohi – Ek Khwab Ke Khilne Ki Kahani is an Indian television series which premiered on 10 August 2015 on Star Plus. The series is the Hindi remake of Star Jalsha's series Ishti Kutum. The show stars Vinita Joshi and Karan Sharma. The show went off air on 27 February 2016.

Plot 
The story of the show is about a young tribal girl named Mohi. Ayush is forced to marry Mohi during his visit to her remote village. After, life takes a sharp turn for Mohi when she comes to the big city. Ayush introduces her as the maidservant to the family as his family, unaware of his wedding to Mohi, continue planning his wedding with his girlfriend.

Cast
 Vinita Joshi as Mohi
 Karan Sharma as Ayush Madhur Gokhle
 Rishma Roshlani as Anusha Gokhle
 Shishir Sharma as Doctor Vinay Dixit 
Gauri Tonk as Rekha Dixit
 Shailesh Dattar as Manohar Gokhle
 Shubhangi Latkar as Sushila Manohar Gokhle
 Nivedita Bhattacharya as Mahua
Nakul Tiwadi as Kapil

Reception
4 Lions Films producer Gul Khan remade the series again as Imlie in 2020 for StarPlus stating, "I know you have heard and seen this before, many times, but we’ll play it more real." While Mohi could not garner good viewership, Imlie airing in a prime slot 8:30 pm became one of the top viewed Hindi GEC.

References

External links 
 Mohi - Ek Khwaab Ke Khilne Ki Kahaani Streaming On Hotstar

2015 Indian television series debuts
Hindi-language television shows
Television shows set in Mumbai
StarPlus original programming
2016 Indian television series endings